The 2016 Auburn Tigers football team represented Auburn University in the 2016 NCAA Division I FBS football season. The Tigers played their home games at Jordan–Hare Stadium in Auburn, Alabama and competed in the Western Division of the Southeastern Conference (SEC). They were led by fourth-year head coach Gus Malzahn. They finished the season 8–5, 5–3 in SEC play to finish in a tie for second place in the Western Division. They were invited to the Sugar Bowl where they lost to Oklahoma.

Before the season

Previous season
The 2015 Auburn Tigers began the season as the preseason pick to win the SEC Championship and a berth in the College Football Playoff. There was also hype about junior QB Jeremy Johnson who sat behind Nick Marshall in 2013 and 2014, being a Heisman Trophy candidate. The hiring of Will Muschamp as defensive coordinator was a major success for the Tigers after Ellis Johnson was let go after a 55-44 defeat in the 2014 Iron Bowl.

The Tigers' season began with some shocking surprises. In a week one showdown against Louisville in the Chick-fil-A Kickoff Game, Auburn built a 24-0 lead, but Jeremy Johnson threw three interceptions and the Cardinals came back from 24-0 before finally falling to Auburn 31-24. Auburn suffered key injuries to Carl Lawson, Tray Matthews, Roc Thomas and Jovon Robinson. This with starting corner TJ Davis out with acl and Joshua Holsey sitting out. A week later, Auburn played against FCS foe Jacksonville State, Auburn again had a rough outing from both Jeremy Johnson and the Tigers' defense. The Tigers would fall to 2-2 and 0-2 in SEC play after being defeated by LSU and Mississippi State. The Tigers defeated San Jose State and then got their first SEC win of the season at Kentucky.

After beating the Wildcats, Auburn would go on to lose four out of their remaining six regular season games. Those consisted of home losses to Georgia 20-13,  Alabama 29-13, Ole Miss 27-19, and a 4 four overtime loss on the road at Arkansas 54-46. Auburn's two only wins in that time were against Idaho and Texas A&M. Auburn finished the season with a 6-6 season and earned a trip to the 2015 Birmingham Bowl against Memphis. The Tigers beat Memphis 31-10 in Birmingham, giving coach Gus Malzahn his first bowl win and the team's first bowl win since 2011.

Following the season, defensive coordinator Will Muschamp left the program to become the head coach at South Carolina, joining him were Travaris Robinson, Lance Thompson, JB Grimes moved on as well to join Cincinnati's coaching staff.

Kevin Steele was hired to be Auburn's new defensive coordinator, and assistants Wesley McGriff, Travis Williams, and Herb Hand were added to the staff.

The offseason saw numerous transfers including: RB Roc Thomas, TE Chris Laye, OL Jordan Diamond, OL Will Adams, DE Gimel President, LB Javiere Mitchell and S Tim Irvin.

Following the season OL Avery Young and OL Shon Coleman chose to forgo their remaining eligibility by entering the 2016 NFL Draft.

Auburn picked up transfers in Baylor RB Kameron Martin, Illinois LB TJ Neal and Miami, OH CB Marshall Taylor.

Texas RT Darius James and Ohio St CB Jamel Dean now available after sitting out 2015.
On August third 2016 Senior running back Jovon Robinson was dismissed from the team.

Returning starters

QB – Sean White - Redshirt Sophomore
 H Back – Kamryn Pettway- Redshirt Sophomore
 H Back- Chandler Cox- Sophomore
 WR – Marcus Davis- Senior
 LT – Austin Golson- Redshirt Junior (played center in 2015)
LG – Alex Kozan- Redshirt Senior
RG – Braden Smith- Junior
 Buck – Carl Lawson- Redshirt Junior
 NT – Montravius Adams- Senior
 DT – Dontavius Russell- Redshirt Sophomore
 NB – Rudy Ford- Senior
 DB – Joshua Holsey- Redshirt Senior 
 CB – Carlton Davis- Sophomore
 FS – Stephen Roberts- Junior
SS – Tray Matthews- Redshirt Junior
 PK – Daniel Carlson- Redshirt Sophomore
 P – Kevin Phillips- Redshirt Junior

Depth chart

  Quarterback
  13 Sean White – RSO 6' 204
  5 John Franklin III – RJR 6'1 176
  6 Jeremy Johnson – SR 6'5 234
 16 Devin Adams – RJR 6'4 248 (walk on)
 15 Tyler Queen – RFR 6'4 241 (injured)
  1 Woody Barrett – FR 6'2 238 (likely redshirt)
 Running back
  21 Kerryon Johnson -SO 6'1 211
  36 Kamryn Pettway – RSO 6'2 242
  9 Kamryn Martin – FR 6' 177
  32 Malik Miller – FR 5'11 229 (injured)
 H-Back/Tight end
 27 Chandler Cox – SO 6'1 236
 85 Jalen Harris – RFR 6'5 258
 X Receiver
 80 Marcus Davis – SR 5'10 181
  3 Nate Craig Myers – FR 6'2 209
  4 Jason Smith – RJR 6'1 188
 Y Receiver
 83 Ryan Davis – SO 5'9 172
 33 Will Hastings – SO 5'9 179 (kicker/walk on)
 19 Marquis McClain -FR 6'3 219
 Z Receiver
 10 Stanton Truitt – RSO 5'10 188
 12 Eli Stove – FR 6' 177
 F Receiver
  8 Tony Stevens- SR 6'4 212
 82 Darius Slayton – RFR 6'2 202
 11 Kyle Davis -FR 6'2 213
 Left Tackle
 62 Darius James – RJR 6'5 320
 75 Deon Mix – RJR 6'4 312
 58 Bailey Sharpe – RFR 6'5 293
 Left Guard
 63 Alex Kozan – RJR 6'4 310
 67 Marquel Harrell – RFR 6'3 318
 ?? Brodariuss Hamm – FR 6'5 325 (likely redshirt)
 Center
 73 Austin Golson – RJR 6'5 314
 52 Xavier Dampeer – SR 6'2 310
 64 Kaleb Kim – RFR 6'4 290
 Right Guard
 71 Braden Smith – JR 6'6 310
 57 Mike Horton – RFR 6'3 325
 66 Tyler Carr – RFR 6'6 316
 Right Tackle
 70 Robert Leff – RSR 6'6 300
 98 Prince Tega Wanogho – RFR 6'8 292
 Buck
 55 Carl Lawson – RJR 6'2 258
  4 Jeff Holland – SO 6'4 250
  ? Nick Coe – FR 6'6 270 (likely redshirt)
 Defensive tackle
 95 Dontavius Russell – RSO 6'4 309
 90 Maurice Swain – RSR 6'3 316
 79 Andrew Williams – RSO 6'4 297
 99 Tyler Carter – RFR 6'3 288 (walk on)
  ?? Tashawn Manning -6'5 270 (likely redshirt)
 Nose tackle
 1 Montravius Adams – SR 6'4 315
 94 Devaroe Lawrence – RSR 6'4 308
 5 Derrick Brown – FR 6'5 335
 93 Antwaun Jackson – FR 6'2 303
 62 Jauntavius Johnson – RFR 6'2 318 (injured)
 Defensive end
 3 Marlon Davidson – FR 6'3 273
 9 Byron Cowart – SO 6'3 277
 10 Paul James III – RJR 6'4 271
 Will Linebacker
 41 Montavius Atkinson – RFR 6'2 211
 17 TJ Neal – SR 6'2 238
 10 Paul James III – (injured)
 Mike Linebacker
 57 Deshaun Davis – RSO 5'11 238
 30 Tre' Williams – JR 6'2 236
 42 Tre Threat – FR 6'2 242
 Sam Linebacker
 49 Darrell Williams – SO 6'2 231
 46 Richard McBryde – RFR 6'2 226
 47 Cameron Toney – RJR 6'2 234
 Nickle
 23 Rudy Ford – SR 6'1 203
 15 Joshua Holsey – RSR 5'11 197
 41 Montravius Atkinson
 Boundary Corner
 6 Carlton Davis – SO 6'1196
 24 John Broussard – FR 5'9 172
 20 Jeremiah Dinson – SO 5'10 180
 18 Jayvaughn Myers – FR 6'1 176 ( will redshirt)
 Free Safety
 14 Stephen Roberts – JR 6'0 183
 23 Rudy Ford
 ?? Daniel Thomas – FR 6'1 193
 ?? Marlon Character – FR 6'0 185 (will redshirt)
 Strong Safety
 28 Tray Matthews – RJR 6'2 207 
 11 Markell Boston – RSO 6' 200
 13 TJ Davis – RSR 6'1 197
 48 Stephen Davis Jr. – FR 6'4 215 (injured)
 Field Corner
 12 Jamel Dean – RFR 6'3 210 (injured)
 31 Javaris Davis – RFR 5'10 182
 15 Josh Holsey – RSR
 22 Marshall Taylor – SR 6'3 191 (injured)
 Place Kicker
 37 Daniel Carlson – RSO
 39 Ian Shannon – RFR
 Punter
 91 Kevin Phillips – RSR
 39 Ian Shannon
 Holder
 29 Tyler Stovall – JR
 5 John Franklin III
 Long Snapper
 Ike Powell
 Zack Wade
 Clarke Smith (walk on)
 Punt Returner
 80 Marcus Davis
 83 Ryan Davis
 Kick Returner
 23 Rudy Ford
 21 Kerryon Johnson
 9 Kamryn Martin
 10 Stanton Truitt

Spring game

The annual 'A-Day' was held on April 9. 45,723 fans came to see the Tigers perform, making this the lowest attendance for 'A-Day' in the Gus Malzahn era.  The Blue team defeated the White team by the score of 19−10.

Schedule
Auburn announced its 2016 football schedule on October 29, 2015, consisting of 8 home and 4 away games in the regular season. The Tigers hosted SEC foes Arkansas, LSU, Texas A&M, and Vanderbilt, and traveled to Alabama, Georgia, Mississippi State, and Ole Miss.

The Tigers hosted all four of their non–conference games: Alabama A&M from the Southwestern Athletic Conference, Arkansas State and Louisiana–Monroe from the Sun Belt Conference, and national title runner-up Clemson from the Atlantic Coast Conference. The 2016 season was the first season the Tigers played eight home games since 2013, when Auburn went 12−2 and appeared in the 2014 BCS National Championship Game.

Schedule Source:

Game summaries

Clemson

The Tigers opened the season with a home contest against the 2015 national runner-up Clemson.  This is considered a rivalry game for both schools.  Clemson came into the game ranked number 2 in the country while Auburn was unranked.  Auburn took an early lead on a long field goal by Daniel Carlson.  Clemson, however, responded with a drive of its own, which resulted in a touchdown on 4th down and goal from the 1-yard line.  Clemson would lead 10-3 going into halftime and add another field goal in the 3rd quarter to make the score 13-3 going into the 4th quarter.  Auburn cut the lead on another field goal by Daniel Carlson, but once again Clemson responded with another touchdown.  Auburn would score a touchdown with just over 3 minutes to play in the ballgame.  Auburn would then stop Clemson on the ensuing possession, but 2 hail mary attempts by Auburn were broken up in the end zone in the last 10 seconds of the ballgame and Clemson held on for the 19-13 victory.  Auburn would fall to 0-1, making this the first opening game loss for Auburn with Gus Malzahn as coach.

Arkansas State

The second game of the season was also the second non-conference opponent for the Tigers.  They played Arkansas State out of the Sun Belt Conference.  Auburn scored first but Arkansas State quickly answered with a long pass play that set up a touchdown to tie the game at 7.  Auburn scored next and never looked back scoring 31 unanswered points.  At halftime, the Tigers lead 38-7.  The final score was 51-14.  Sean White had 3 touchdowns, more than he had in all his past Auburn games combined.  The game was Auburn's best offensive performance, according to many writers, since the 2014 season.  Overall, this was a very impressive victory for Auburn, and for Gus Malzahn, who used to coach at Arkansas State in 2012.  Auburn also remains unbeaten against the Sun Belt Conference after this win.

Texas A&M

The third game of the season is the first conference game for Auburn. SEC Western Division opponent Texas A&M comes to Auburn to play that game. Auburn beat the 25th ranked A&M last year 26-10. Auburn has yet to beat the Aggies at Auburn. Auburn has been out scored 104 to 59 at home by A&M.

LSU

The fourth game of the season was a rivalry game against the LSU Tigers.

The game would end with a controversial win.  After an illegal shift was called against LSU with one second to go, LSU would go on to score what was initially called a touchdown as time expired before being reviewed and determined that time expired prior to the snap, negating the touchdown and giving Auburn the 18-13 win.

This was Auburn's first SEC victory without scoring a touchdown since 2008, when they won 3-2 against Mississippi State.  Daniel Carlson was 6-6 on field goals in the game, including a 51-yard field goal.  Auburn held LSU star running back Leonard Fournette to less than half the yards they allowed him in 2015.  It was Auburn's first home conference win since October 25, 2014 against South Carolina.

Louisiana–Monroe

The fifth game of the season was the annual homecoming game.  The Louisiana–Monroe Warhawks came to Auburn for their tenth game ever against the Tigers.  The last time the Warhawks and the Tigers clashed, the result was a 31−28 Auburn victory in overtime back in the 2012 season.  However, this one went very differently.  Auburn dominated from the start.  The Tigers had their highest point total since 59 versus San Jose State in 2014.  The defense also allowed the fewest points since 3 against Western Carolina in 2013.  Auburn improved to 3-2 to go over .500 for the first time in the season.

Mississippi State

The sixth game of the season was the first road game for the Tigers.  They played at Mississippi State where they had not won since 2010.  However, Auburn easily won the game.  After an early interception put the Bulldogs in good field position, the Tigers defense responded, holding Mississippi State to a field goal attempt that was no good.  Auburn seized the momentum after that.  Starting running back Kerryon Johnson got hurt early in the game, but Kamryn Pettway took over the game with a 169-yard performance including 3 touchdowns.  Also, the Auburn defense scored a touchdown when Carl Lawson forced a fumble which was picked up by Montravius Adams and returned 13 yards for a touchdown. Auburn led 35-0 at halftime.  The Tigers slowed down in the second half, only attempting one pass on offense.  The final score was 38-14.  It broke a two-game losing streak to the Bulldogs and improved Auburn's record to 4-2 and 2-1 in the SEC.  The win also propelled Auburn into the AP Poll the next week, as the Tigers were ranked #23.

Arkansas

After their only bye week of the season, Auburn played Arkansas in the seventh game of the year.  In the 2015 season, the Tigers lost a heartbreaker in Fayetteville, falling 54−46 in four overtimes. The Tigers avenged that loss in a very big way, dominating the Razorbacks from the start.  The Tigers had over 500 yards of rushing, the Razorbacks only had 25.  It was Auburn's biggest margin of victory over an SEC opponent since 1970. The Tigers also built their lead in the overall series, now leading it 14−11−1.

Ole Miss

The eighth game of the season was a trip to Oxford, Mississippi to face Ole Miss.  In an offensive shootout, Ole Miss quarterback Chad Kelly set the Ole Miss school record for most passing attempt and most passing yards in a single game.  However, Auburn had just as much success rushing as Ole Miss had passing.  Kamryn Pettway had a career-high 236 yards.  The key play came late in the game with Auburn leading 33–29 and Ole Miss driving down the field for the go-ahead touchdown.  Ole Miss tight end Evan Engram dropped a pass which would have likely resulted in a touchdown.  On the next play, Auburn defender Josh Holsey intercepted quarterback Chad Kelly's pass and returned it the Ole Miss 30 yard line.  That set up a Kerryon Johnson touchdown that made it a two possession game, ultimately sealing the win for Auburn.  Auburn became bowl eligible with their 6th win of the year.  Auburn now leads the overall series 30−11−0.

Vanderbilt

The ninth game of the season is against SEC Eastern Division opponent Vanderbilt.  The last game, which was in the 2012 season, was a 17−13 Vanderbilt victory.  Vanderbilt leads the all-time series 21−20−1.

Georgia

The tenth game of the year is the annual Deep South's Oldest Rivalry game against Georgia.  In the last meeting, Georgia won by the score of 20−13 in the 2015 season.  Georgia has a slim lead in the series, which has been played since 1892, 56−55−8.

Alabama A&M

The eleventh game will be the final home game for Auburn making it Senior Night.  Alabama A&M and Auburn have only played once before with the Tigers winning that game 51−7 in the 2012 season.  That win gave the Tigers the overall series lead of 1−0−0.

Alabama

The final game of the regular season is the annual Iron Bowl clash with Alabama.  In the last meeting, which was in the 2015 season, Alabama won 29−13 on their way to a national championship.  Alabama leads the all-time series 44−35−1. Auburn has not beat Alabama in Tuscaloosa since 2010.

Oklahoma

The Tigers were selected for the Sugar Bowl to play Oklahoma.  The Sugar Bowl usually takes the highest-ranked SEC team, but because the SEC champion, Alabama, was in the playoff, the Sugar Bowl chose Auburn.  It will be the first time Auburn and Oklahoma have played since the 1972 Sugar Bowl, for the 1971 season.  The Sooners won that game 40–22 and thus have a 1–0–0 series lead.

Rankings

References

Auburn
Auburn Tigers football seasons
Auburn Tigers football